Flavio Bravo is an American politician. He is a Democratic member for the 26th district of the Arizona House of Representatives since 2023.

Life and career 
Bravo was raised in Phoenix, Arizona. He attended the University of San Francisco.

In August 2022, Bravo defeated incumbent State Representative Christian Solorio and Gil Hacohen in the Democratic primary election for the 26th district of the Arizona House of Representatives. In November 2022, he was elected along with Cesar Aguilar in the general election. He assumed office in 2023.

References 

Living people
Place of birth missing (living people)
Year of birth missing (living people)
Democratic Party members of the Arizona House of Representatives
21st-century American politicians
University of San Francisco alumni